Eduardo de Almeida Navarro (Fernandópolis, February 20, 1962) is a Brazilian philologist and lexicographer, specialist in Old Tupi and Nheengatu. He is a full professor at the University of São Paulo, where he has been teaching Old Tupi since 1993, and Nheengatu since 2009. Eduardo Navarro is also the author of the books Método moderno de tupi antigo (Modern Method of Old Tupi), 1998, and Dicionário de tupi antigo (Dictionary of Old Tupi), 2013, important works on the Tupi language.

Biography
Eduardo Navarro graduated in Geography from the São Paulo State University and in Classics from the University of São Paulo. In 1995, she received her PhD with a thesis on the issue of languages in the Renaissance.

In 1998, Navarro launched the book Método moderno de tupi antigo: a língua do Brasil dos primeiros séculos (Modern Method of Old Tupi: The Language of Brazil in the First Centuries), which aims to enable students to read 16th and 17th century texts in this language, showing the penetration of Old Tupi in Brazilian culture.

In 2013, Navarro released Dicionário de tupi antigo: a língua indígena clássica do Brasil (Dictionary of Old Tupi: the Classic Indigenous Language of Brazil), in which he describes almost eight thousand words of this language, thus surpassing Tesoro de la lengua guaraní, by Antonio Ruiz de Montoya, which displays about five thousand entries. He is currently preparing a Nheengatu dictionary.

Contributions

Tupi literature
Eduardo Navarro was the organizer and main translator of the books Poemas: lírica portuguesa e tupi (Poems: Portuguese and Tupi poetry), of 1997, and Teatro, of 1999, in which he wrote explanatory notes and modernized the original spelling of the texts, most of which had been written in Old Tupi by José de Anchieta.

He was also responsible for writing the preface and footnotes of the reedition of ' book , and translated part of it directly from the Old Tupi language. The first edition of this book had been published in 1850 in Paris. The new edition was launched in October 2007, with a bilingual version in French and Portuguese. The excerpt translated by Navarro was Poemas brasílicos (Brazilian Poetry), by Father Cristóvão Valente.

Camarão Indians' letters

In 2021, Eduardo Navarro announced that he had translated the six letters of the Camarão Indians, discovered more than 130 years ago in the Netherlands, where they have been kept for almost 400 years. The letters, all in Tupi, are the only record of literate Indians writing in the colonial period. He plans to publish them as a book.

Tupi language revival

Since the year 2000, Eduardo Navarro has been training teachers of Old Tupi for indigenous schools in Paraíba, in an initiative called Projeto Poti. The first course in Old Tupi, held in Baía da Traição, lasted two years and trained 17 monitors to act as teachers in Potiguaras schools, aiming to multiply the knowledge about this language in order to recover it.

There was also the institutionalization of the Tupi language in the curriculum of the indigenous schools. In fact, the subject is taught from the early years to high school.

Hans Staden (film)

Eduardo Navarro was responsible for the translation into Tupi of the entire script of the  about the German adventurer Hans Staden, who visited Brazil twice in the 16th century.

Awards
 2000 — Medalha Brasil 500 Anos, awarded by the Brazilian Genealogical Institute and by the São Paulo Academy of Letters.

 2013 — Los Destacados de ALIJA, awardes by Asociación de Literatura Infantil y Juvenil Argentina, for the translation of Cabeza hueca, cabeza seca.

Selected works

See also
 Antônio de Araújo
 José de Anchieta
 Tupi language

References

Works cited

Videos

Audio

External links 

 Eduardo de Almeida Navarro at CNPq
 Official channel at YouTube
 Official channel (old) at YouTube
 Dicionário de tupi antigo
 Método moderno de tupi antigo
 Gabarites of Método moderno
 Curso elementar de tupi antigo
 Vocabulário tupi–português do curso elementar

1962 births
São Paulo State University alumni
University of São Paulo alumni
Academic staff of the University of São Paulo
Brazilian philologists
Brazilian lexicographers
Linguists of Tupian languages
People from Fernandópolis
20th-century philologists
20th-century lexicographers
21st-century philologists
21st-century lexicographers
Living people